A windfall gain is an unusually high or abundant income, that is sudden and/or unexpected.

Types
Examples of windfall gains include, but are not limited to:
Gains from demutualization — this example can lead to especially large windfall gains. A study in 1999 into the potential demutualization of the John Lewis Partnership predicted that partners would receive upwards of £100,000 in windfall gains if the company were to be floated on the stock market.
Unexpected inheritance or other large gift from another
Sweepstakes winnings 
Winning a lottery or success in another form of gambling
Returns on investments
Proceeds or profit from a large sale
Game show, or other contest winnings
Employment payroll bonus
Natural resources
Foreign aid
Proceeds from an insurance claim
Settlement from a lawsuit
Discoveries from treasure hunting

Uses
What people do with windfall gains is subject to much debate. While they differ from one account to the next, most economists hypothesize that the majority of the gains are saved, due to the Permanent Income Hypothesis.

Windfall profits
Windfall profits are a type of windfall gain. They can occur due to unforeseen circumstances in a product's market, such as unexpected demand or government regulation. 

Since the profits were unforeseen, some legislators believe that taxing them at a higher rate, or confiscating them outright, should not hurt the company. This type of taxation is known as a windfall profits tax.

Regardless of taxation, some businesses view windfall gains as a liability, as it creates difficulties when it comes to managing cash flow and investor expectations. It may also indicate a problem with the company's strategy and the ability of executives to forecast the market. That said, windfalls also present a substantial opportunity for reinvestment and helps buffer the company's bottom line.

External links

References

Household income